There are several places called Île Verte (French for "Green Island"):

 Île Verte (Finistère), France
 Île Verte (Grenoble), France
 Île Verte (Bas-Saint-Laurent), Quebec, Canada
 the French name for Green Island (Fortune), Newfoundland and Labrador
 Île Verte (Îles Laval), part of Îles Laval
 Île Verte (Kerguelen Islands)
 Île Verte (Mayotte)